Bogoriella is a genus of crustose lichens in the family Trypetheliaceae. The genus was circumscribed by Alexander Zahlbruckner in 1928, with Bogoriella subpersicina assigned as the type species. It was later shown that Bogoriella was an older name for Mycomicrothelia, and so all of the species that were in that genus needed to be transferred to Bogoriella.

Species
Bogoriella apposita 
Bogoriella chiquitana 
Bogoriella collospora 
Bogoriella complexoluminata 
Bogoriella confluens 
Bogoriella conothelena 
Bogoriella decipiens 
Bogoriella isthmospora 
Bogoriella macrocarpa 
Bogoriella megaspora 
Bogoriella modesta 
Bogoriella obovata 
Bogoriella pachytheca 
Bogoriella pandanicola 
Bogoriella queenslandica 
Bogoriella rubrostoma 
Bogoriella subpersicina 
Bogoriella thelena 
Bogoriella triangularis 
Bogoriella xanthonica

References

Verrucariales
Lichen genera
Dothideomycetes genera
Taxa named by Alexander Zahlbruckner
Taxa described in 1928